Patrick Altham Kelly PHL KC*HS (born 23 November 1938) is an English prelate of the Roman Catholic Church.  He is the archbishop emeritus of the Archdiocese of Liverpool following his resignation which took effect on 27 February 2013; he was formerly Vice President of the Catholic Bishops' Conference of England and Wales.

Early life
Kelly was born in Morecambe, Lancashire, educated at Preston Catholic College, and was ordained to the priesthood on 18 February 1962, at the Venerable English College, in Rome.

Parishes
Kelly taught systematic theology in Oscott Seminary and later became rector of the latter in 1978.

On 9 March 1984, Kelly was appointed Bishop of Salford by Pope John Paul II. He received his episcopal consecration on the following 3 April from Bishop Thomas Holland, with archbishops Derek Worlock and Maurice Couve de Murville serving as co-consecrators. Kelly was appointed Archbishop of Liverpool by Pope John Paul II on 21 May 1996.

In early 2012, Kelly celebrated the Golden Jubilee of his ordination to the sacred priesthood, commencing with an intimate Mass at the local Carmelite convent and followed the next day by Solemn Mass at Liverpool Metropolitan Cathedral. The Mass was attended by Roman Catholic clergy, including cardinals Cormac Murphy-O'Connor and Jean-Louis Tauran. The papal nuncios to Britain and Guatemala, archbishops Mennini and Gallagher were also in attendance; alongside Cardinal (then Archbishop) Vincent Nichols.

In his spare time the Archbishop enjoys listening to classical music and attending concerts, especially those given by the Royal Liverpool Philharmonic Orchestra.

On the morning of Monday 10 December 2012, Kelly was admitted to hospital after suffering from a mild stroke, his condition was described as 'comfortable'

Subsequent suffering from the stroke, Kelly was advised to take a long period of convalescence which he did in Lancashire, North West England. Despite having a year left in office before he was due to tender his official resignation, it was announced on Monday 7 January 2013, that Kelly had submitted his resignation to Pope Benedict XVI, who accepted Kelly's resignation on 27 February 2013. On 21 March 2014, Malcolm McMahon, formerly Bishop of Nottingham, was appointed by Pope Francis to succeed Kelly.

SSPX
Kelly was opposed to making agreements with the Society of Saint Pius X in the hopes of better defending the legacy of the Second Vatican Council.

References

External links

 Profile at Catholic Hierarchy website

1938 births
Living people
People from Morecambe
20th-century Roman Catholic bishops in England
21st-century Roman Catholic archbishops in the United Kingdom
Roman Catholic archbishops of Liverpool
English people of Irish descent
Roman Catholic bishops of Salford
English College, Rome alumni
British Roman Catholic archbishops